Vikash Mohan can refer to:

 Vikash Mohan (Indian cricketer), an Indian cricketer
 Vikash Mohan (Trinidadian cricketer) (born 1994), a Trinidadian cricketer